Central Kurdish, also called Sorani, is a Kurdish dialect or a language that is spoken in Iraq, mainly in Iraqi Kurdistan, as well as the provinces of Kurdistan, Kermanshah, and West Azerbaijan in western Iran. Sorani is one of the two official languages of Iraq, along with Arabic, and is in administrative documents simply referred to as "Kurdish".

The term Sorani, named after the former Soran Emirate, is used especially to refer to a written, standardized form of Central Kurdish written in the Sorani alphabet developed from the Arabic alphabet in the 1920s by Sa'ed Sidqi Kaban and Taufiq Wahby.

History
Tracing back the historical changes that Sorani has gone through is difficult. No predecessors of Kurdish are yet known from Old and Middle Iranian times. The extant Kurdish texts may be traced back to no earlier than the 16th century CE. Sorani originates from the Sulaymaniyah region.

1700s-1918 
The oldest written literature in Sorani is reported to have been Mahdîname (the book of Mahdi) from 1762 by Mulla Muhammed ibn ul Haj. Sorani thus only emerged as a written language after the decline of the Gorani vernacular, the Ardalan state and the rise of Baban around Sulaymaniyah. During the Baban era, Sorani emerged as an important literary vernacular and many poets such as Nalî wrote in Sorani despite being proficient in Arabic and Persian. Nalî mentioned that he wrote in Sorani knowing his poetry might not receive the same dissemination as it might have done in the more prestigious Arabic or Persian. Contemporaries of Nalî like Salim and Mistefa Begi Kurdi also wrote in Sorani and their writings would become the foundation for the standard variety of Sorani. When the Baban dynasty was overthrown in 1850, the golden era of Sorani ended and poets including Nalî left the Sulaymaniyah region. Haji Qadir Koyi continued the tradition of writing in Sorani and lamented the lack of promotion of Sorani among the Kurdish clergy and called those who did not do so 'bastards'. Beside Koyi, Riza Talabani also promoted Sorani as a literary language.

Prior to the 20th century, only three non-poetic Sorani works are known to exist being Mawludname by Sheikh Husen Qazi (1793-1871), a glossary of Arabic-Kurdish by Ehmedi from 1795 and a translation of the introduction to Gulistan by Saadi Shirazi.

The language of these works heavily relied on Arabic and Persian which prevented Sorani from enjoying further progress beside being a literary language. Only after World War I did this change.

Beside poetry and the few non-poetic works mentioned above, linguistic works on Sorani also existed. Leonard Chodźko wrote a sketch of the Sulaymaniyah variety of Sorani in 1857, de Morgan wrote his "Etudea linguistiques: Dialectee kurdea " in 1904 in which he compared eleven varieties of Kurdish to each other and with Persian and Sanskrit. Later, in 1903, Soane published a learner textbook and vocabulary list of Sorani in 1903 for British personnel in Kurdistan, while Oskar Mann wrote Die Mundart der Mukri Kurden containing a grammar sketch of the Sorani variety of Mukriyan in 1906. Lastly, Ludvig Olsen Fossum published a grammar book in 1919 based on the Sorani variety spoken around Mahabad.

1918-1930s

Iraq 
After the dissolution of the Ottoman Empire, much of the Sorani-speaking region came under British rule (present-day Iraq). Sorani subsequently became the language for prose, media and journalism and a distinct alphabet was also formed for the language. The language also experienced a Kurdified vocabulary by the 1950s. The Brits started publishing periodicals in Sorani to mobilize the Kurds since the Sorani-speaking Kurds of Iraq were more urbanized, educated and nationalist than the Kurmanji-speaking population around Duhok. Kurdish nationalism was promoted to prevent any Turkish control over Kirkuk and Mosul. For this, the first government press in Sorani was established in Sulaymaniyah in 1920 which propelled Sorani in becoming a language of media, education and administration. The government press had by 1923 published 6 books, 118 issues of the weekly publication Pêşkewtin (Progress), 14 issues of Bangî Kurdistan (The Call of Kurdistan) and 16 issues of Rojî Kurdistan (The Day of Kurdistan). The period also saw the publication of Sorani works for schools, and courts began using the language as well. In 1923, Taufiq Wahby was instructed to produce school books in Sorani by the Iraqi government and his modified orthography of Sorani would be implemented as the official Sorani orthography in school textbooks two decades later. His orthography included the purge of the Arabic letters from the Kurdish alphabet, while creating new letters Wahby also supported moving over to the Latin script however this was not accepted among the literary society nor the state.

In the 1930s, the League of Nations urged Iraq to draft a law guaranteeing the use of the Kurdish language. The Iraqi authorities reluctantly agreed but the British knew the law would not be implemented once they left Iraq. This pushed the Brits to implement the law themselves in May 1931 which made Kurdish an official language in the governorates of Sulaymaniyah, Kirkuk, and Erbil. Kurds were however dissatisfied with this since Kurdish was only allowed to be used in elementary schools and Iraq had also fully Arabized the education and administration in Kirkuk and Mosul. In subsequent years, linguistic rights for Kurds were either ignored or reluctantly implemented.

Iran 
The development of Sorani was slow in Iran and experienced many challenges. The earliest use of Sorani was during the Simko Shikak revolt from 1918 to 1922 which saw the use of Sorani side by side with Kurmanji as official languages in the area controlled by the rebels. After the defeat of the revolt, formal use of Sorani ceased until 1946. During the rule of Reza Shah from 1925 to 1941, Iran was extremely centralist and Persian was the dominant language to the detriment of other languages. A decree issued by the government in 1935 suppressed Kurdish and marked the end of Kurdish as a written language. Only a dozen handwritten poetry manuscripts in Sorani exist from this period. This included poems by Hassan Saifulquzzat, Said Kamil Imani and Khalamin Barzanji.

1940s-1950s 
By the 1940s, the Sulaymaniyah variant of Sorani had become the standard variant of Sorani and even Kurds in Iran accepted this. The 1940s also saw the use of Sorani in radio broadcasting which elevated its prestige but also the urgency in proficiency since it was linked to current events.

Iraq 
The 1940s experienced an intermittent suppression of Kurdish but Sorani still succeeded in becoming considerably standardized by the end of the period. By the time the 14 July Revolution took place in 1958, Sorani had incorporated the norms of a standard language which had given it legitimacy. During the new Iraqi Republic from 1958 to 1968, the number of journals in Sorani increased fast and a Kurdish department was established at the University of Baghdad and moreover a Directorate General of Kurdish Studies was established to answer the growing Kurdish demands for mother tongue education.

In 1960, the first Sorani-Arabic dictionary was published.

Iran 
After the ousting of Reza Shah in 1941 and the Anglo-Soviet occupation of Iran, nationalist movements among Kurds gained strength and Sorani became the formal language again, especially in Mukriyan where the Komeley Jiyanewey Kurd (KJK) used Sorani as their official language. Sorani was also introduced in schools, administration and in mosques. Kurds in Iraq aided with this, for example by exporting school books to Iran. Language planning was also in the works but rudimentary. When the Republic of Mahabad fell, formal use of Sorani also ceased in Iran, however the new Pahlavi state under Mohammad Reza Pahlavi would become more tolerant than that of Reza Shah. Researcher Hassanpour argues that the reason for this was the vulnerability of the new central government which had to approach the Kurds more relaxed. For this, some developments did take place including the publication of periodicals in Sorani but also state-sponsoed radio broadcasting and teaching Kurdish at the University of Tehran.

In the 1950s, the Iranian authorities began restricting and controlling the tolerance towards Kurdish which continued towards the Iranian Revolution in 1979. No positive rights were given and any written use was controlled. However, the restrictions had to be loosen since Kurds in Iran were receiving radio broadcasting from Iraq and Soviet Armenia. Iran thus allowed for limited radio broadcasting in Mahabad, Sanandaj and Kermanshah which legitimized and popularized Sorani further.

1960s-1980s

Iraq 
The Kurdish Scientific Academy was established in Baghdad in 1968 which devoted a significant part of their job to develop neologisms, grammar books, writing style guide-lines, a modified orthography and research in linguistics subjects. The Kurdistan Democratic Party and its media also used Sorani as their official language despite its leader Mustafa Barzani being a Kurmanji-speaker. Despite the deterioration of relations between the Kurds and Iraq in the 1970s, the state still sponsored the implementation of Sorani as language in secondary schools. However, this ended by 1978 when the Iraqi authorities embarked on an Arabization to quell Kurdish nationalism. On this, Hassanpour wrote in 1992 that:

Sorani continued as the main language in elementary and secondary schools in Iraqi Kurdistan. In the 1980s, the state sponsored publications in Sorani despite warring with the Kurds.

Iran 
In the 1960s, schooling in Kurdish or teaching Kurdish was unthinkable, even in private. However, the University of Tehran began offering two courses in Kurdish even though one had to refrain from discussing Kurdish and had to call it a 'dialect'. The policy of the Pahlavi state in regard to Kurdish was like that of safety valve where rights were restricted when the state felt threatened. After the Iranian Revolution in 1979, the new Iranian constitution was ambiguous towards Kurdish but the new regime discouraged the use of Sorani both in private and in public. Limited media in Sorani was allowed in the subsequent years. The policy of safety valve continued throughout the 1980s.

1990s

Iraq 
Kurdistan Region Parliament passed a provisional constitution in 1992 making Kurdish the official language of Kurdistan Region. 'Kurdish' would refer to Sorani which also became the language of instruction in Kurmanji– and Gorani–speaking areas until these linguistic communities demanded education Kurmanji and Gorani, respectively. Sorani ceased as language of instruction in these areas in the mid–2000s. In 1997, the Kurdistan Sciency Academy was established in Erbil with the goal of creating a unitary language in the autonomous region.

Iran 
More leniency was given towards Kurdish, especially Sorani Kurdish in the 1990s, but use of Sorani in administration and education was still not allowed. The debate on mother tongue education entered the public sphere in the 2000s.

2000s-2010s 
World Wide Web has had a significant impact on Sorani as thousands of Sorani-speakers have gotten free access to literature. It also became easier to listen to radio and watch television. The Internet moreover fostered the use of Sorani in Iran and the diaspora, where the language had no official status.

Orthography remains a challenge for Sorani. In Iraq, Sorani orthography is moving towards being based on a single morpheme while Sorani-speakers in Iran make longer words. An example is the word to review which can be spelled both pêdaçûnewe and pê da çûnewe.

Arabic and Persian words continue to be purged from written Sorani and are getting replaced by neologisms. Conversely, Sorani is borrowing words from the English language.

Iraq 
After the fall of Saddam Hussein in 2003, Iraq declared Sorani Kurdish as the official language of the country beside Arabic. The first section of Article 4 secures this. In 2006, Duhok Governorate began using Kurmanji as their official language as a way of resisting Sorani. Fearing the loss of hegemony, 53 academics, writers and poets pushed the Kurdish Parliament to declare Sorani as the official language of the autonomous region. This attempt failed multiple times and Kurmanji remains the official Kurdish language in Dohuk Governorate. In the 2010s, criticism arose due to the quality of the Sorani school textbooks, media texts and signage. In 2011, two journalism professors from Salahaddin University criticized the state of Sorani in Kurdistan Region which could affect its use among the people. They also expressed dismay over the method of the Parliament in using the language, since the institution wrote their bills and laws in Arabic and then translated to Sorani.

Iran 
More flexibility was shown to Kurdish in the mid-2000s by the reformists, likely to win the Kurdish vote. Kurds used the opportunity and began publishing more in Sorani, set up private language learning courses and also advocated for the implementation of Article 15 of the Constitution which would allow the use of regional languages. The use of Sorani in Iran has since then been revitalized by Kurdish book publishers like Mang. Nonetheless, the use of Sorani in the public school system is not supported by Iranian nationalists and conservatives who believe it could damage the unity of the nation-state.

Writing system

Sorani is written with a modified Arabic alphabet.

In the Sorani writing system almost all vowels are always written as separate letters. This is in contrast to the original Arabic writing system and most other writing systems developed from it, in which certain vowels (usually "short" vowels) are shown by diacritics above and under the letters, and usually omitted.

The other major point of departure of the Sorani writing system from other Arabic-based systems is that the Arabic letters that represent sounds that are non-existent in Sorani are usually (but not always) replaced by letters that better represent their Kurdish pronunciation.

Media and education
Iraq is the only country in which a Kurdish language has enjoyed official or semi-official rights during the last few decades. Kurdish media outlets in Iraq mushroomed during the 1990s, spurred by the semi-autonomous status the region has enjoyed since the uprising against the Saddam regime in 1991. The use of Kurdish in media and education is prevalent in Iraqi Kurdistan. Seven of the top 10 TV stations viewed by Iraqi Kurds are Kurdish-language stations, and the use of Arabic in Kurdistan schools has decreased to the extent that the number of Iraqi Kurds who speak Arabic fluently has dropped significantly over the past decades.

Some Kurdish media in Iraq seem to be aiming for constructing a cross-border Kurdish identity. The Kurdish-language satellite channel Kurdistan TV (KTV), owned by the Kurdistan Democratic Party (KDP), for example, employs techniques that expose audiences to more than one Kurdish variety in the same show or program. It has been suggested that continuous exposure to different Kurdish varieties on KTV and other satellite television stations might make Kurdish varieties increasingly mutually intelligible.

In Iran, state-sponsored regional TV stations air programs in both Kurdish and Persian. Kurdish press are legally allowed in Iran, but there have been many reports of a policy of banning Kurdish newspapers and arresting Kurdish activists.

Phonology 

Sorani has 9 phonemic vowels and 26 to 28 phonemic consonants (depending on whether the pharyngeal sounds /ħ/ and /ʕ/ are counted or not).

Vowels 
The following table contains the vowels of Sorani. Vowels in parentheses are not phonemic, but have been included in the table below because of their ubiquity in the language. Letters in the Sorani alphabet take various forms depending on where they occur in the word. Forms given below are letters in isolation.

Some Vowel Alternations and Notes 
The vowel [æ] is sometimes pronounced as [ə] (the sound found in the first syllable of the English word "above"). This sound change takes place when [æ] directly precedes [w] or when it is followed by the sound [j] (like English "y") in the same syllable. If it, instead, precedes [j] in a context where [j] is a part of another syllable it is pronounced [ɛ] (as in English "bet").

The vowels [o] and [e], both of which have slight off-glides in English, do not possess these off-glides in Sorani.

Consonants 
Letters in the Sorani alphabet take various forms depending on where they occur in the word. Forms given below are letters in isolation.

As in certain other Western Iranian languages (e.g. Kurmanji), the two pharyngeal consonants /ħ/ and /ʕ/ exist in most Iraqi dialects of Sorani. However, they are rare in the dialects of Central Kurdish in Iran.

An important allophonic variation concerns the two velar sounds /k/ and /g/. Similar to certain other languages of the region (e.g. Turkish and Persian), these consonants are strongly palatalized before the close and mid front vowels (/i/ and /e/) in Central Kurdish.

Syllable 
Sorani allows both complex onsets (e.g. spî: "white", kwer: "blind") and complex codas (e.g. farsh: "carpet"). However, the two members of the clusters are arranged in such a way that, in all cases, the Sonority Sequencing Principle (SSP) is preserved. In many loanwords, an epenthetic vowel is inserted to resyllabify the word, omitting syllables that have codas that violate SSP. Originally mono-syllabic words such as /hazm/ ("digestion") and /zabt/ ("record") therefore become /ha.zim/ and /za.bit/ respectively.

Primary stress always falls on the last syllable in nouns, but in verbs its position differs depending on tense and aspect. Some have suggested the existence of an alternating pattern of secondary stress in syllables in Sorani words.

Grammar

Absolute State
A noun in the absolute state occurs without any suffix, as it would occur in a vocabulary list or dictionary entry.  Absolute state nouns receive a generic interpretation, as in "qâwa rash a." ("Coffee is black.") and "wafr spî a." ("Snow is white").

Indefinite State 
Indefinite nouns receive an interpretation like English nouns preceded by a, an, some, or any.

Several modifiers may only modify nouns in the indefinite state. This list of modifiers includes: 
 chand [ʧand] "a few"
 hamu [hamu] "every"
 chî [ʧi] "what"
 har [haɾ] "each"
 ... i zor [ɪ zoɾ] "many"
Nouns in the indefinite state take the following endings:

A few examples are given below showing how nouns are made indefinite:
 پیاو pyâw 'man' > پیاوێک pyâwèk 'a man'
 نامه nâma 'letter' > نامه‌یه‌ک nâmayèk 'a letter'
 پیاو pyâw 'man' > پیاوان pyâwân '(some) men'
 ده‌رگا dargâ 'door' > ده‌رگایان dargâyân '(some) doors'

Definite state 
Definite nouns receive an interpretation like English nouns preceded by the.

Nouns in the definite state take the following endings:

When a noun stem ending with [i] is combined with the definite state suffix the result is pronounced [eka]  ( i + aka → eka)

Verbs 
Like many other Iranian languages, verbs have a present stem and a past stem in Sorani. The present simple tense, for example, is composed of the aspect marker "da" ("a" in Sulaymaniyah dialect) followed by the present stem followed by a suffixed personal ending. This is shown in the example below with the verb نووسین / nûsîn ("to write"), the present stem of which is نووس / nûs.

Note that the personal endings are identical for the second person plural (Plural "you") and third person plural ("they").

Similarly, the simple past verb is created using the past stem of the verb. The following example shows the conjugation of the intransitive verb هاتن hâtin ("to come") in the simple past tense. The past stem of "hâtin" is "hât".

Sorani is claimed by some to have split ergativity, with an ergative-absolutive arrangement in the past tense for transitive verbs. Others, however, have cast doubt on this claim, noting that the Sorani Kurdish past may be different in important ways from a typical ergative-absolutive arrangement. In any case, the transitive past tense in Sorani is special in that the agent affix looks like the possessive pronouns and usually precedes the verb stem (similar to how accusative pronouns in other tenses). In the following example, the transitive verb نووسین / nûsîn ("to write") is conjugated in the past tense, with the object "nâma" ("letter"). The past stem of the verb is "nûsî".

Note in the example above that the clitics attaching to the objects are otherwise interpreted as possessive pronouns. The combination "nâma-m" therefore is translated as "my letter" in isolation, "nâma-t" as "your letter", and so on.

The agent affix is a clitic that must attach to a preceding word/morpheme. If the verb phrase has words other than the verb itself (as in the above example), it attaches to first word in the verb phrase. If no such pre-verbal matter exists, it attaches to the first morpheme of the verb. In the progressive past, for example, where the aspect marker "da" precedes the verb stem, the clitic attaches to "da".

See also

 Kurdish alphabets
 Sorani grammar

Notes

References

External links

 VejinBooks, collection of Kurdish literary and historical texts
 Vejin Dictionaries, collection of Kurdish dictionaries (written in Arabic script)
 The Kurdish Academy of Language (unofficial)
 Yagey Ziman, the Kurdish language school (Sorani)
 inKurdish: English–Kurdish Translation
 Dictio: English–Kurdish (Sorani) Dictionary

Kurdish language
Languages of Kurdistan
Kurdish Sorani
Kurdish Sorani